ㅣ(i) is a vowel in the Korean hangul. The Unicode for ㅣ is U+3163.

Stroke order

Hangul jamo
Vowel letters